Hamidah binti Khamis (born 31 October 1955) is the Malaysian who has been the spouse and wife of Ahmad Zahid Hamidi, the 9th President of United Malays National Organisation (UMNO) since 2018, 14th Deputy Prime Minister of Malaysia since 3 December 2022 and 11th Deputy Prime Minister of Malaysia from July 2015 to May 2018.

Marriage 
She was married to Dato' Seri Ahmad Zahid Hamidi and issued with 5 children, 3 son and 2 daughter.

Honours 
  :
  Companion Class I of the Order of Malacca (DMSM) - Datuk (2013)
  :
  Grand Knight of the Order of Sultan Ahmad Shah of Pahang (SSAP) – Dato' Sri (2014)

References

1955 births
Living people
People from Perak
Malaysian people of Malay descent
Malaysian Muslims
Spouses of Deputy Prime Ministers of Malaysia